The Department of Justice and Public Administration is the department of the Basque Government responsible for the community's public administration and justice system. It was created in 1936 and restored in 1980 under democracy.

Ministers 
 1936-1960: Jesus Maria Leizaola
 1978-1980: Jose Antonio Agiriano
 1980-1982: Carmelo Renobale
 1984-1985: Juan Porres
 1985-1991: Juan Ramon Gebera
 1991:Javier Caño
 1991-1995: Jose Ramon Rekalde
 1995-1997: Ramon Jauregi
 1997-1998: Francisco Egea
 1998-2001: Sabin Intxaurraga
 2001-2009: Joseba Azkarraga
 2009-2012: Idoia Mendia
 2012-present: Josu Erkoreka

External links 
  
  

Basque Government
Basque Country